Kristina Maksuti (born 6 February 1993) is an American-born Albanian professional footballer who plays as a forward for SV Meppen of the Frauen-Bundesliga and for the Albania women's national team. In 2019 she won the Golden Boot with FF Lugano in the Swiss NLA with 18 goals.

Career
Maksuti has been capped for the Albania national team, appearing for the team during the 2019 FIFA Women's World Cup qualifying cycle.

See also
List of Albania women's international footballers

References

External links
 
 
 

1993 births
Living people
Albanian women's footballers
Women's association football forwards
MSV Duisburg (women) players
Frauen-Bundesliga players
Albania women's international footballers
Albanian expatriate footballers
Albanian expatriate sportspeople in Germany
People from Bethlehem, New York
Soccer players from New York City
American women's soccer players
Fordham Rams women's soccer players
American expatriate women's soccer players
American expatriate soccer players in Germany
American people of Albanian descent
Sportspeople of Albanian descent
FF Lugano 1976 players
Swiss Women's Super League players
Klepp IL players
Toppserien players
American expatriate sportspeople in Norway
American expatriate sportspeople in Switzerland
Expatriate women's footballers in Switzerland
Expatriate women's footballers in Norway